Atergia is a genus of sponges belonging to the family Polymastiidae.

Species:

Atergia corona 
Atergia corticata 
Atergia villosa

References

Polymastiidae
Sponge genera